John Millen may refer to:

 John Millen (American politician) (1804–1843), American politician
 John Millen (Australian politician) (1877–1941), Australian politician
 John Millen (sailor) (born 1960), Canadian sailor